Alanta Dance is an original Nigerian music genre and dance. Like most African dances, it requires vigorous hand, hips and leg movements. The dance style uses a patterned movement of the hands as if fanning flames while raising one leg. This dance shows the rich creativity and humour of the Nigerian people. The dance is usually accompanied with a trance-like or painful expressions on the face.

Popularity
The dance is popular in Nigeria. In many Nigerian music videos, musicians are seen dancing Alanta. Popular Alanta dancers include Uti, the winner of Big Brother Africa 2010 and Maye Hunta.

Nigerian culture